Sasregen is a Hasidic dynasty from Reghin, Romania. Rabbi Mordechai Dovid Rubin was the previous Sasregener Rebbe in the Midwood section of Brooklyn, New York.  He died in 2020 during the COVID-19 pandemic.

History
Sasregen is one of many offshoots of the Ropshitz Hasidic dynasty that were re-established in New York City after World War II by surviving descendants of Grand Rabbi Naftali Tzvi Horowitz, the first Ropshitzer Rebbe; others include Beitsh, Dolina, Dombrov, Dzhikov, Melitz, Shotz, Strizhov, Stutchin, Sulitza, and Tseshenov.

The previous Sasregener Rebbe was the son of Rabbi Jacob Israel Jeshurun Rubin (30 Kislev 5645 [December 18, 1884], Zhydachiv, – 15 Sivan 5704 [June 6, 1944]), av beis din (head of the rabbinical court) of Solitza and Sasregin, Romania, who was murdered in the Auschwitz concentration camp, and Alte Nechama Malka Dachner, daughter of Rabbi Chaim Dachner of Seret, who was also killed in the Holocaust. His brothers were the late Rabbi Shmuel Shmelka Rubin, Sulitzer Rebbe of Far Rockaway, and the late Rabbi Menachem Mendel Rubin, who was the Muzhayer Rebbe (d. 2008) of Midwood, Brooklyn.

Rubin married Mirl Eichenstein, daughter of Rabbi Joshua Eichenstein. Their eldest son, Rabbi Yehoshua Rubin, is the Bobover Rav of 45th Street, and son-in-law of the late Grand Rabbi Naftali Halberstam of Bobov. The Sasregener Rebbe was the author of Kol HaMikra'ot ShebeTalmud Bavli, which he began in 1955 and published in 1987.

Dynasty

Grand Rabbi Naftali Tzvi Horowitz of Ropshitz (1760–1827), author of Zera Kodesh.
Grand Rabbi Asher Yeshaya Rubin of Ropshitz (d. 1845), son-in-law of Rebbe Naftali Tzvi, known as Reb Osher'l, son-in-law of Rabbi Naftali Tzvi. Author of אור ישע [Or yeshaʻ].
Grand Rabbi Menachem Mendel Rubin of Glogov (Głogów Małopolski) (c. 1806 – 1873), son of Rebbe Asher Yeshaya.
Grand Rabbi Meir Rubin of Glogov (1829–1897), son of Rebbe Menachem Mendel.
Grand Rabbi Baruch Rubin of Brezdovitz (Berezdivtsi, Lviv Oblast, Ukraine) and Gherla (1864–1935), son of Rebbe Meir. Author of שארית ברוך She'erit Barukh (Jerusalem, 1973).
 Grand Rabbi Yaakov Yisrael veYeshurun Rubin of Sulitza (Sulița) and Sasregen (Reghin) (1884–1944), son of Rebbe Baruch. Rabbi of Sulitza, and Rebbe in Sasregen. He was murdered in the Holocaust.
Grand Rabbi Mordechai Dovid Rubin (Died 8 Nissan 5780 which is on April 2, and he was approximately 90 years old), Sasregener Rebbe, son of Rebbe Yaakov Yisrael veYeshurun, and son-in-law of Rebbe Yehoshua Eichenstein of Grosswardein of the Zidichov dynasty. Rabbi of K'hal Sasregen congregation in the Midwood neighborhood of Brooklyn, New York.

Notes

References

 This edition includes:
לקוטי מהרמ"ם Liḳuṭe Maharmam by his son Rebbe Menachem Mendel of Glogiv (in Or yeshaʻ)
לקוטי מהר"ם Liḳuṭe Maharam by his son Rebbe Meir of Glogiv (in Or yeshaʻ)
Facsimiles (including annotated transcriptions) of manuscripts by and about members of the Ropshitz dynasty, particularly ancestors of the Brizdovitz dynasty
שארית ברוך Sheʼerit Barukh by his son Rebbe Baruch of Brezdovitz
גליוני יוש"ר Gilyone yosher, by his son Rebbe Yaakov Yisrael veYeshurun of Sulitza
זרע קודש מצבתה Zeraʻ ḳodesh matsavtah, a genealogical treatise by his son Rabbi Asher Yeshaya (who was murdered in the Holocaust).

External links
 Kehal Sasregen website
 Sasregen Rebbe Counting the Omer, 2001 (video)

Hasidic dynasties
Hasidic Judaism in Europe
Hasidic Judaism in the United States
Jewish Hungarian history
Reghin